Neringa is a Lithuanian feminine given name. Notable people with the name include:
  (born 1972), Lithuanian poet and translator
 Neringa Aidietytė (born 1983), Lithuanian racewalker
  (born 1966), creator of Lithuanian TV program and musical group Tele Bim-Bam
Neringa Dangvydė (1975-2020),  Lithuanian writer, poet, book illustrator, and literary critic
 (born 1980) Lithuanian badminton player
Neringa Siaudikyte, Lithuanian singer and songwriter 
 Neringa Venckienė (born 1971), Lithuanian lawyer and politician

See also

Lithuanian feminine given names